Bronschhofen AMP railway station is a railway station in the village of Bronschhofen, part of the municipality of Wil, in the Swiss canton of St. Gallen. It is an intermediate stop on the Wil–Kreuzlingen line of THURBO.

Services 
The following services stop at Bronschhofen AMP:

 St. Gallen S-Bahn : half-hourly service from Wil to Romanshorn.

References

External links 
 
 

Railway stations in the canton of St. Gallen
THURBO stations